Michael R. Cusack is an Australian animator, voice actor, photographer, writer, director, and producer. He is the co-creator and co-star, along with fellow animator Zach Hadel, of the Adult Swim animated series, Smiling Friends, and creator and star of YOLO and Koala Man.

Life and career

Cusack was born and raised in Dapto, a suburb of the Australian city of Wollongong. He grew up watching South Park, The Simpsons and Futurama. He became interested in animation in his 20s, and taught himself Adobe Flash using internet tutorials. Cusack uploaded his content to his YouTube channel and Newgrounds account. Cusack began to collaborate with Hadel, online at first then later in person, when Cusack traveled to meet him in Burbank, California, United States . Cusack is also known for creating and portraying the fictional character Lucas the Magnificent, a parody of New Atheist "neckbeards", in live-action YouTube videos and on Twitter, beginning in 2014.

With Studio Yotta, Cusack animated a parody Rick and Morty episode, Bushworld Adventures, that aired on Adult Swim on April Fools' Day 2018. The success of Bushworld Adventures led Cusack to create YOLO: Crystal Fantasy and Smiling Friends for the network, as well as becoming a collaborator with Rick and Morty creator Justin Roiland, voicing characters for his video game High on Life and television film The Paloni Show Halloween Special.

Filmography

References

External links
 

Australian animators
Australian male voice actors
Australian surrealist artists
Australian YouTubers
Australian expatriates in the United States
People from Wollongong
Comedy YouTubers
Living people
Web series producers
YouTube animators
Year of birth missing (living people)